Video gaming industry in Malaysia is a massive industry and pastime in Malaysia that includes the production, sale, import/export, and playing of video games. In 2019, Malaysia are the 21st largest video game market in the world, with a total revenue of USD633 million gained.

With support by government such as Malaysian Digital Economy Corporation (MDEC), video games industry in Malaysia saw a rapid development and considered as one of the largest gaming market in Southeast Asia.

History 
Malaysia entered the video game industry in 1990s, notably in 1994 when Motion Pixel, a small Malaysian studios was offered by LucasArts and JVC to worked together for a game named Ghoul Patrol. Since then, Malaysia started to take seriously in video gaming industry.

The video game industry started to going further after encouragement from Prime Minister Mahathir Mohamad to explore more in digital sector. Along with animation industry, video games are one of the MDEC's main focus for digital content development. Several studios founded as the response such as Metronomik Studios and Magnus Games Studio.

International gaming industry 
Malaysia is the home of the first and only Sony Interactive Entertainment Worldwide Studios in ASEAN region, known as Malaysia Studio for Southeast Asia region and served as technical support studio for some video games. It is led by Hasnul Hadi Samsudin, former MDEC Vice President of Digital Creative Content Division.

Future projection 
Malaysia is projected to become one of the largest gaming market in Asia by at least 2026. Statista projected that Malaysia will having a net gain of USD676 million, despite will face decline in terms of growth rate. Malaysia will also have around 16.7 million users with penetration rate of nearly 50 percent by 2026.

References

 
Science and technology in Malaysia
Malaysian culture